Dinobot is a fictional character from Beast Wars in the Transformers universe.  He debuted in the series premiere as a subordinate of Megatron, leader of the villainous Predacons. However, Dinobot challenges Megatron's leadership, and is shortly expelled from his crew. He eventually joins the ranks of Optimus Primal and the Maximals. He is driven by a code of honor somewhat modeled on samurai bushido. He fights alongside the Maximals as part of their crew before ultimately sacrificing himself to save a group of primates from a Predacon onslaught. In the following season, Megatron creates a new Dinobot with transmetal technology, who is completely loyal to Megatron. Outside of the television series, Dinobot's likeness was used to create several toys. The character was one of the most complex in the series and proved to be a much bigger hit than the creators expected."The question that has haunted my being has been answered: The future is not fixed. My choices are my own. And yet, how ironic, for I now find I have no choice at all! I am a warrior... let the battle be joined."

- Dinobot, "Code of Hero".

Biography

Beast Wars Show 
In season one, Dinobot originally arrives on prehistoric Earth with Megatron and the rest of the Predacons aboard the Darksyde. When the Predacons scan the planet for local animals, in order to create beast modes for themselves, Dinobot receives the form of a velociraptor (though his appearance makes him more similar to a dromaeosaurus). After their arrival, Dinobot believes that Megatron has led the Predacons to the wrong planet and attempts to usurp him in a duel. However, Scorponok, one of Megatron's loyal crew members, blasts Dinobot away. Determined to find the abundant amounts of energon, he confronts the Maximals outside their base, and challenges Optimus Primal’s leadership in a duel. When Optimus loses his footing, Dinobot has the opportunity to defeat him, but chooses not to saying that a victory like that would lack honor. The engagement is interrupted by a surprise attack from the Predacons. Optimus saves Dinobot's life during the attack, prompting the two to come to terms.

From then on, Dinobot serves alongside the Maximals during the Beast Wars, and proves to be a valuable ally in both strength and cunning, as well as in his knowledge of his former Predacon comrades, which helps him anticipate what each one of them would do. However, Dinobot frequently clashes with Optimus over the Maximals' morals, and has a rocky relationship with Rattrap, who normally refers to him as "Chopperface," to which Dinobot replies by calling him "Vermin." Despite this, he grows to respect the Maximals, and forges strong friendships with Optimus and Rattrap, though the relationship between him and Rattrap tends more towards them being frenemies, as the two seem to enjoy their verbal sparring and engage in it at every opportunity, yet despite their apparent dislike will consistently come to one another's aid.

In season two, Dinobot is one of the few Transformers who does not become a Transmetal, but he still remains a strong asset to the Maximals. Following the destruction of an artificial moon that hovered around Earth, Dinobot researches the strange goings-on and realizes that Megatron had in fact landed on the correct planet: Earth. He infiltrates the Predacon base, and steals two golden discs which contain information pertaining to the planet's vast supply of Energon, as well as the location of The Ark. The disks also trouble Dinobot, as he believes they can predict the future. Dinobot eventually contemplates rejoining the Predacons after realizing that Megatron was going to triumph over the Maximals. He returns one of the disks to Megatron, but defies an order to destroy Rattrap, realizing that the scale of Megatron's ambition is too dangerous.

Consumed with guilt, Dinobot returns to the Maximals. He eventually discovers that the future written on the discs can be altered after witnessing Megatron destroy a mountain, and watching the writings on the disc change. After Megatron also realizes this, he orders the Predacons to eradicate all the primitive ancestors of humankind, on the planet, believing the attack would deny the Autobots an important ally in their future battle against the Decepticons. Although he is now aware that the future can be changed, Dinobot chooses to preserve history instead, and proceeds to single-handedly defeat all of the Predacons. He then subdues Megatron himself with a makeshift maul and retrieves the golden disc that he had previously given back. However, Dinobot sustains mortal wounds during the conflict, and destroys the disc with the last of his energy. His fellow Maximals arrive shortly after and stand by his side as he passes away. His final words are:"Tell my tale to those who ask. Tell it truly, the ill deeds along with the good and let me be judged accordingly. The rest is silence." And with that his spark leaves his body and Dinobot dies. Optimus gives a proper eulogy for his fallen soldier, saying:  "He lived a warrior and died a hero. Let his Spark join the Matrix with the greatest of Cybertron."

Out of respect for their fallen comrade, the Maximals give Dinobot a proper funeral, performing the missing man flyover, in which his body is placed in a suspended animation pyre that disintegrates him. The hominid that Dinobot saved finds his makeshift maul and makes use of it, beginning humanity's technological development.

Comics

Dreamwave Productions 
Dinobot's earliest fictional depiction in comics was in a two part short story told in Dreamwave's Transformers: More Than Meets The Eye series. In this tale Dinobot and his leader enter an ancient Autobot library housing a node of the super computer Vector Sigma where they view the datatracks concerning the Autobots and Decepticons of The Great War. As Dinobot dispatches a Maximal security agent his leader obtains the Golden Disk artifact and announces he wishes to be addressed as Megatron from now on.

Fun Publications 
Dinobot's early story would continue in the Timelines tale Dawn of Futures Past, where he was seen escaping with the disc alongside Megatron and Scorponok, outraged because he was not able to battle the Maximals honorably, having to be cowed into fleeing by Megatron. Dinobot was further outraged when Megatron planned to flee into Transwarp, but was delighted when Megatron opened fire on the Axalon while doing so. In this story, Dinobot was never named. In the subsequent story Dawn of the Predacus, Dinobot would be seen looking upon the protoformed Grimlock, possibly an indication of where he took his name from.

IDW Publishing 
Dinobot appears along the rest of the Maximals in the series Beast Wars: The Gathering, which takes place during season 3 of the animated Beast Wars series.

Dinobot had a biography printed in the Beast Wars Sourcebook by IDW Publishing.

Dinobot II 
Using a blank protoform, a fragment of Rampage's spark, alien technology, and DNA of the original Dinobot, Megatron is able to create a clone of Dinobot in Transmetal II form, possessing Dinobot's combat experience and skills but none of his honor, willing to mount sneak attacks against weaker opponents rather than engage in fair combat. However, following the destruction of Rampage, Dinobot II is somehow infused with the spirit of his predecessor, causing him to regain the original Dinobot's honor and turn against Megatron at a crucial moment, providing the Maximals with the key to defeating him. He dies once more in the final struggle, remaining on board the shattered Decepticon ship the Nemesis as it crashes, but is honored by the Maximals for his role in their victory.

Other media
Dinobot appears in the TFcon 2012 live script reading prelude comic. In this story, Cheetor, Dinobot, Rattrap, and Silverbolt discover three Constructicons and some Predacons on prehistoric Earth and are joined by the Wreckers.

Other Versions

War for Cybertron Trilogy 
In this timeline, Dinobot never joins the Maximals, and remains with the Predacons. He however still has reservations about Megatron using the Golden Disk to alter history. When the Decepticons travel back in time and meet the Predacons, looking for the allspark, Dinobot decided that neither Megatron should have it, after failing to make an alliance with Starscream and Blackarachnia. This leads him to face both Megatrons and, despite being fatally wounded, he manages to recover the Autobots  Matrix of leadership, giving it back to Optimus Prime. After his death his spirit guides Optimus Primal to join Optimus Prime, to defeat Megatron and find the allspark.

Reception 
Dinobot was named the 3rd best upgrade in Beast Wars history by Topless Robot.

The WTF@TFW podcast for February 26, 2009 selected the Henkei Dinobot toy as one of the New Picture Picks.

At BotCon 2010, Hasbro named Dinobot as one of the first five robot inductees in the Transformers Hall of Fame. He was also the first "fan's choice" inductee, as fans around the world submitted nominees for the spot. After the nominees were narrowed down to the top five, Dinobot beat Soundwave, Grimlock, Jazz and Shockwave with 31,000 votes.

Toys 
 Beast Wars Deluxe Dinobot (1996)
The Dinobot toy came with a mutant mask that was not utilized in the animated series, although it was seen on early prototypes of the animation. Because the toy was made before the show, it was not an exact match for the colors.
This toy was later recolored as Beast Wars Grimlock and as Dinobots Grimlock.
Dinotron was a remold of the original Dinobot.
 ''Beast Wars Takara Deluxe Dinobot (1997)
When the toy was sold in Japan it was repainted with lighter stripes and a gold head to match the television model. In Japan Dinobot was sold alone and packaged with Tarantulas. The Japanese version of this toy had the head painted with metallic colors to more closely match the animated appearance of Dinobot.
 Beast Wars McDonald's Dinobot (1998)
A premium toy included with Happy Meals, this Dinobot is a transmetal, although he did not become a transmetal in the animated series.
 Beast Wars Transmetal Dinobot (Unreleased)
During the original Transmetal Line, A Transmetal version of Dinobot was made and made it to the prototype stage before being scrapped and replaced with a Transmetal Terrorsaur.
 Beast Wars Fox Kids Deluxe Dinobot (1999)
A redeco of Dinobot done in browns with red stripes across the back.
 Beast Wars Transmetal II Deluxe Dinobot (1999)
The Transmetal II toy of Dinobot came in three variants. The first was released as a post-Christmas edition in late 1998 (for the 1999 release year) in show-accurate colors (this version being the model for the series), identifiable due to all pre-1999 Transmetal 2s having a "Transmetal II" logo. The second version makes use of navy blue and metallic maroon detailing on an ivory-colored body, as opposed to brown and maroon. The "II" logos are replaced with a "Transmetal 2" logo. The third and final Transmetal II Dinobot was nearly as commonplace as the second, with the ivory tooling replace with a whiter colored plastic. The remaining parts were decorated in a brighter blue and vacuum-metallized red. (The white, red and blue Dinobot is said to have been exclusive to Wal-Mart, but K-Mart stores in 2002 were shown to also have them in stock.)
The transmetal II Dinobot was repainted into the Dinobot Rapticon.
 Beast Wars 10th Anniversary Dinobot (2006)
In 2006 the original Dinobot toy was one of the toys selected for the Beast Wars 10th Anniversary toyline. He was repainted in more show-accurate coloring. He came packaged with one of the six pieces used to make the Transmutate toy plus a DVD of his most famous episode "Code of Hero".
 Timelines Deluxe Darksyde Dinobot (2006)
One of the BotCon 2006 exclusive figure is a remold of Armada Hoist which is a homage to Beast Wars Dinobot. This figure is supposed to represent Dinobot before he was reformatted into an animal form. He turns into a backhoe.
This toy was featured on page 19 of the book Transformers: The Fantasy, The Fun, The Future by Erin Brereton published by Triumph Books.
 Beast Wars Takara 10th Anniversary Dinobot (2007)
In 2007, Takara Tomy is releasing their version of the 10th Anniversary of Beast Wars toys. Selected molds have included Dinobot who will be painted show accurate along with something Hasbro's version did not have: teeth are painted to give him more of a look like the show. According to the DVD enclosed with the toy, he may be sold with Blackarachnia at a sale price. (Like how Optimus Primal is sold with Megatron as a special offer.)
 Universe Deluxe Dinobot (2009)
As part of the 25th Anniversary commemoration, the Transformers Universe series released a new mold of Dinobot. Like the Beast Wars figure, the Universe figure lacked show-accurate coloration. The transformation is also slightly different, with the arms tucking into the chest rather than the legs.
 Masterpiece'' Dinobot (2018)
A figure designed to conform as closely to Dinobot's original appearance as possible with action base.  But limited distribution release due to failure to meet the quality requirement.

References

Transformers characters
Fictional robotic dinosaurs
Fictional samurai
Transformers (toy line)